Marija Jovanović (born 26 December 1985) is a retired Montenegrin handball player. She played for the Montenegrin national team.

She competed at the 2010 European Women's Handball Championship, where the Montenegrin team placed sixth, and Jovanović was listed among the top ten goalscorers of the tournament (scoring 31 goals). As captain, she led the Montenegrin national team when they won a gold medal at the European Championship in Serbia. After two years spent at the Ferencvárosi, she decided to end her career and graduated in Business Economics in 2018. She has been in private business ever since.

Honours
Club
EHF Champions League:
Semifinalist: 2011, 2012, 2013
EHF Cup Winners' Cup:
Winner: 2006 and 2010
Women's Regional Handball League:
Winner: 2010 and 2011
Silver Medallist: 2009
Montenegrin Championship:
Winner: 2006, 2007, 2008, 2009, 2010 and 2011
Romanian Championship:  
Winner: 2012, 2013
Montenegrin Cup:
Winner: 2006, 2007, 2008, 2009, 2010 and 2011
Romanian Supercup:
Winner: 2011

National team
European Handball Championship:
Gold Medallist: 2012
Olympics:
Silver Medallist: 2012

References

External links

Official website

1985 births
Living people
Sportspeople from Podgorica
Montenegrin female handball players
Handball players at the 2012 Summer Olympics
Olympic handball players of Montenegro
Olympic medalists in handball
Olympic silver medalists for Montenegro
Expatriate handball players
Montenegrin expatriate sportspeople in Romania
Montenegrin expatriate sportspeople in Russia
SCM Râmnicu Vâlcea (handball) players
Medalists at the 2012 Summer Olympics
Mediterranean Games medalists in handball
Mediterranean Games bronze medalists for Montenegro
Competitors at the 2009 Mediterranean Games